Harefield is a suburb of London.

Harefield may also refer to:

 Harefield Entertainment, a 1602 court festival near London
Harefield, Southampton, a suburb in England
 Harefield, New South Wales, a locality in Australia
Harefield railway station, a closed station